Kylie Robilliard (born 11 June 1988) is an athlete from Guernsey, who most notably took part in the 2010 Commonwealth Games. She set a personal best in the first round of the women's 100m event but did not qualify for the semi-finals. In her main event the 100m Hurdles, she placed 4th in heat 2 in a time of 13.94sec.  Narrowly missing out on the final, she placed 9th over all.

She was awarded the Lambourne Shield for outstanding sporting achievement by a boy or girl under 18 at the Guernsey's Sporting Achievement Awards in February 2004.

She won a silver medal in the women's 100m and a gold medal in the women's 100m hurdles at the Island Games held in Åland, Finland in 2009.

In 2011, she participated in the 2011 Island Games and won a gold medal in the 100m. She broke the Island Games record with a time of 11.94 seconds.

References

External links
Athlete profile: Kylie Robilliard, United Kingdom Athletics Power of 10 website

Living people
Commonwealth Games competitors for Guernsey
Guernsey female sprinters
Athletes (track and field) at the 2010 Commonwealth Games
Athletes (track and field) at the 2014 Commonwealth Games
1988 births
Guernsey female athletes
British female sprinters